The 1993 Scottish Cup final was played between Rangers and Aberdeen at Celtic Park on 29 May 1993. Owing to ground reconstruction at Hampden Park, the fixture was played at another stadium for the first time since 1924.

Rangers won the match 2–1, thereby securing a domestic treble. Rangers' scorers were Mark Hateley, scoring in his second consecutive Scottish Cup final, and Neil Murray. Lee Richardson scored Aberdeen's goal.

Match details

References

See also
 Aberdeen F.C.–Rangers F.C. rivalry

1993
Cup Final
Scottish Cup Final 1993
Scottish Cup Final 1993
20th century in Glasgow